Chișlaz is a commune in Bihor County, Crișana, Romania with a population of 3,135 people. It is composed of seven villages: Chiraleu (Berettyókirályi), Chișlaz, Hăucești (Hőke), Mișca (Micske), Poclușa de Barcău (Poklostelek), Sărsig (Sárszeg) and Sânlazăr (Szentlázár).

References

Communes in Bihor County
Localities in Crișana